Duchang is a county in the north-northeast of Jiangxi province, People's Republic of China. Containing part of Poyang Lake, it is under the jurisdiction of the prefecture-level city of Jiujiang.

Administrative divisions
Duchang County has 12 towns and 12 townships.
12 towns

12 townships

Climate

References

External links

 
County-level divisions of Jiangxi
Jiujiang